The 2012 Wyoming Cavalry season was the team's thirteenth season as a football franchise and second in the current Indoor Football League (IFL).

Regular season

All start times are local to home team

Roster

Standings

References

External links
Wyoming Cavalry official website
Wyoming Cavalry official statistics
Wyoming Cavalry at Casper Star-Tribune
2012 IFL regular season schedule

Wyoming Cavalry
Wyoming Cavalry seasons
Wyoming Cavalry